Timothy Dingwall Bateson (3 April 1926 – 15 September 2009) was an English actor.

Life and career
Born in London, the son of solicitor Dingwall Latham Bateson and the great-nephew of rugby player Harold Dingwall Bateson, he was educated at Uppingham School in Rutland and Wadham College, Oxford. At Oxford, he read history, rowed cox for the Wadham College Boat Club during Eights Week and performed in the Oxford University Dramatic Society.

Bateson's stage credits included the first British production of Samuel Beckett's Waiting for Godot in 1955 at the Arts Theatre in London in a production directed by Peter Hall. In 1957 he starred in the BBC adventure serial The Adventures of Peter Simple.

He appeared in many film, television and radio productions including The Cadfael Chronicles, Doctor Who (in the serial entitled The Ribos Operation) and Labyrinth.

He also provided the voices for several characters in the children's TV series TUGS (1989). Most notably, he provided the voice of O.J., the oldest member of the Star Fleet.

Since 1994, he did the voice of Measley from the audiotape version of The Animals of Farthing Wood.

Bateson was featured in many productions of Focus on the Family Radio Theater. Among his appearances on the program were in A Christmas Carol (1996), where he doubled as narrator and as the Ghost of Christmas Present; Dietrich Bonhoeffer: The Cost Of Freedom (1997), portraying Dr. Karl Bonhoeffer; Ben-Hur (2001), portraying Balthasar;  Father Gilbert Mysteries: The Silver Cord (2004), portraying Mr. Lehman; and Silas Marner (2007), portraying Mr. Macey.

He voiced the house-elf Kreacher in Harry Potter and the Order of the Phoenix, his last work.

Family and death
In 1953, Bateson married former actress Sheila Shand Gibbs, with whom he had three children, Elizabeth, Andrew and Caroline. He and his wife were committed Christians. He died in London at the age of 83 on 16 September 2009. He was survived by his wife, their children and his older sister Ann.

Selected filmography

Nicholas Nickleby (1947) – Lord Verisopht
Vice Versa (1948) – Coker
The Guinea Pig (1948) – Tracey
The History of Mr. Polly (1949) – Apprentice (uncredited)
White Corridors (1951) – Dr. Cook
Never Look Back (1952) as Court Official (uncredited)
Sunday Night Theatre (1952–1954) – Val
Carrington V.C. (1955) – 1st Soldier in NAAFI (uncredited)
Richard III (1955) – Ostler
The Black Arrow (1958) – Lord Shoreby
Tread Softly Stranger (1958) – Fletcher
Mother Courage and Her Children (1959) – 'Swiss Cheese'
Yesterday's Enemy (1959) – Simpson (uncredited)
The Mouse That Roared (1959) – Roger
Devil's Bait (1959) – Dentist (uncredited)
Bleak House (1959) – William Guppy
Our Man in Havana (1959) – Rudy (uncredited)
The Shakedown (1960) – Estate Agent
The Big Day (1960) – Clerk
There Was a Crooked Man (1960) – Flash Dan
Barnaby Rudge (1960) – Simon Tappertit
Seven Keys (1961) – Bank Teller (uncredited)
The Unstoppable Man (1961) – Rocky
What a Carve Up! (1961) – Porter – (US: 'No Place like Homicide')
On the Fiddle (1961) – Stretcher Bearer (uncredited)
The Day the Earth Caught Fire (1961) – Printer in Printroom (uncredited)
The Golden Rabbit (1961) – Henry Tucker
Ring-a-Ding Rhythm (1962) – Coffee shop owner
Crooks Anonymous (1962) – Partrige
The Girl on the Boat (1962) – Purser
Jigsaw (1962) – Porter (uncredited)
Doctor in Distress (1963) – Mr. Holly
Seventy Deadly Pills (1964) – Goldstone
Father Came Too! (1964) – Wally
Nightmare (1964) – Barman
The Evil of Frankenstein (1964) – Hypnotized Man (uncredited)
The Knack ...and How to Get It (1965) – Junkyard Owner
The Wrong Box (1966) – Clerk
Thirty-Minute Theatre (1966) – Big Ted
After the Fox (1966) – Michael O'Reilly (uncredited)
Danger Route (1967) – Halliwell
Torture Garden (1967) – Fairground Barker
The Anniversary (1968) – Mr. Bird
Z-Cars (1968, TV) – Andrew Rogers
Twisted Nerve (1968) – Mr. Groom
The Italian Job (1969) – Dentist
1917 (1970) – Corporal Falk
Doctor at Large (1971, TV) – Mr. Clifford
 Kindly Leave the Kerb (1971, TV) –
Please Sir! (1971, TV) – Dutton
The Rivals of Sherlock Holmes (1971, TV) – Goujon
Barlow at Large (1973) – Smeed
David Copperfield (1974) – Mr. Dick
Autobiography of a Princess (1975) – Blackmailer
The Good Life (1976, TV) – Arthur Bailey
Joseph Andrews (1977) – Master of Hounds
The Duchess of Duke Street (1977, TV) – Mr. Bream
Doctor Who: The Ribos Operation (1978, TV) – Binro
Last of the Summer Wine (1978, TV) – Amos Hames
Going Straight (1978, TV) – Oaksey
All Creatures Great and Small (1978, TV) – Mr. Beckwith
As You Like It (1978) – Sir Oliver Martext
Pinocchio (1978, TV) – Schoolmaster
A Hitch in Time (1978) – Headmaster (uncredited)
The Famous Five (1978, TV) – Professor Hayling
Diary of a Nobody (1979) – Cummings
Rings on Their Fingers (1979) – Meter Reader
Tanglewoods' Secret (1980) – Mr. Tandy
Treasures of the Snow (1980) – Portier 
Grange Hill (1980–1983) – Mr. Thomson
Loophole (1981) – 3rd Interviewer
Chintz (1981) – Shop Assistant
Terry and June (1981) – Mervyn
Q.E.D. (1982) – Alfie
The Hunchback of Notre Dame (1982) – Commerce
High Road to China (1983) – Alec Wedgeworth
Don't Wait Up (1983) – Mr. Burton
A Christmas Carol (1984) – Mr. Fezziwig
Minder (1984) – Railwayman
Ever Decreasing Circles (1984) – Laurence
Dramarama (1985) – Keeper
Labyrinth (1986) – The Worm / The Four Guards / Goblin (voice)
Foreign Body (1986) – Agent at Harley Street
East of Ipswich (1987) – Mr. Macklin
Hi-de-Hi! (1987) – Charlie
Chelmsford 123 (1988) – Latin Tutor
A Handful of Dust (1988) – MacDougal
TUGS (1989–1990, TV Series) – O.J. / Eddie / Little Ditcher / Lord Stinker / Garbage Corporation Master / Big Mickey (voice)
Zorro (1990–1993, TV Series) – Padre Benites
Shakespeare: The Animated Tales (1992) – Antigonus (voice)
The Animals of Farthing Wood (1994) – Measley (Audiotape only)
True Blue (1996) – Porter
For My Baby (1997) – Max Liebman
Merlin (1998) – Father Abbot
Les Misérables (1998) – Banker
Midsomer Murders (1999, TV) – Mr. Jocelyne
The Criminal (1999) – Thomas
The Messenger: The Story of Joan of Arc (1999) – English Judge
The Clandestine Marriage (1999) – Gaoler
Barbara (2000, TV) – Mr. Dugdale
The 10th Kingdom (2000, TV) – Tooth Fairy
The Discovery of Heaven (2001) – Mr. Keller
All or Nothing (2002) – Harold
Fakers (2004) – Old Gezzer
Ladies in Lavender (2004) – Mr. Hallett
Oliver Twist (2005) – Parson
Mrs. Palfrey at the Claremont (2005) – Summers
My Hero (2006, TV) – Leo
Terry Pratchett's Hogfather (2006, TV) – The Lecturer
Harry Potter and the Order of the Phoenix (2007) – Kreacher (voice) (final film role)

References

External links
 

1926 births
2009 deaths
20th-century English male actors
21st-century English male actors
Alumni of Wadham College, Oxford
English male film actors
English male radio actors
English male Shakespearean actors
English male stage actors
English male television actors
English male voice actors
English Christians
Male actors from London
People educated at Uppingham School
Royal Shakespeare Company members